The 1948 Palestine war was fought in the territory of what had been, at the start of the war, British-ruled Mandatory Palestine. It is known in Israel as the War of Independence (Milkhemet Ha'Atzma'ut) and in Arabic as a central component of the Nakba. It is the first war of the Israeli–Palestinian conflict and the broader Arab–Israeli conflict. During the war, the British terminated the Mandate and withdrew, ending a period of rule which began in 1917, during the First World War. Beforehand, the area had been part of the Ottoman Empire. In May 1948, the State of Israel was established by the Jewish Yishuv, its creation having been declared on the last day of the Mandate. During the war, around 700,000 Palestinian Arabs were displaced.

After the war, the former territory of the mandate was divided between the State of Israel, which captured about 78% of it, the Kingdom of Jordan (then known as Transjordan), which captured and later annexed the area that became the West Bank, and Egypt, which captured the Gaza Strip, a coastal territory on the shores of the Mediterranean Sea, in which the Arab League established the All-Palestine Government.

The war had two main phases, the first being the 1947–1948 civil war, which began on 30 November 1947, a day after the United Nations voted to adopt the Partition Plan for Palestine, which divided the territory into Jewish and Arab sovereign states, and an international Jerusalem (UN Resolution 181). Partition was accepted by the Jewish leadership, but rejected by Palestinian Arab leaders and the Arab states. This phase of the war is described by historians as the "civil", "ethnic" or "intercommunal" war, as it was fought mainly between Jewish and Palestinian Arab militias, supported by the Arab Liberation Army and the surrounding Arab states. Characterised by guerrilla warfare and terrorism, it escalated at the end of March 1948 when the Jews went on the offensive and concluded with their defeating the Palestinians in major campaigns and battles, establishing clear frontlines. During this period the British still maintained a declining rule over Palestine and occasionally intervened in the violence.

The British terminated the Mandate at midnight at the end of 14 May 1948. On that day, the last remaining British troops and personnel departed the city of Haifa and the Jewish leadership in Palestine declared the establishment of the State of Israel. This was followed the next day by the invasion of Palestine by the surrounding Arab armies and expeditionary forces.

The invasion marked the beginning of the second phase of the war, the 1948 Arab–Israeli War. The Egyptians advanced on the southern coastal strip and were halted near Ashdod; the Jordanian Arab Legion and Iraqi forces captured the central highlands of Palestine. Syria and Lebanon fought several skirmishes with the Israeli forces in the north. The Jewish militias, organised into the Israel Defense Forces, managed to halt the Arab forces. The following months saw fierce fighting between the IDF and the Arab armies, which were being slowly pushed back. The Jordanian and Iraqi armies managed to maintain control over most of the central highlands of Palestine and capture East Jerusalem, including the Old City. Egypt's occupation zone was limited to the Gaza Strip and a small pocket surrounded by Israeli forces at Al-Faluja. In October and December 1948, Israeli forces crossed into Lebanese territory and pushed into Egypt's Sinai Peninsula, encircling the Egyptian forces near Gaza City. The last military activity happened in March 1949, when Israeli forces captured the Negev desert and reached the Red Sea. In 1949, Israel signed separate armistices with Egypt on 24 February, Lebanon on 23 March, Transjordan on 3 April, and Syria on 20 July. During this period the flight and expulsion of the Palestinian Arabs continued.

During the war, around 700,000 Palestinian Arabs were displaced and most of their urban areas were destroyed. Many Palestinian Arabs ended up stateless, displaced either to the Palestinian territories captured by Egypt and Jordan or to the surrounding Arab states; many of them, as well as their descendants, remain stateless and in refugee camps.

In the three years following the war, about 700,000 Jews immigrated to Israel from Europe and Arab lands, with one third of them having left or been expelled from their countries of residence in the Middle East. These refugees were absorbed into Israel in the One Million Plan.

Background

The 1948 War came as the culmination of 30 years of friction between Jews and Arabs during the period of British rule of Palestine when, under the terms of the League of Nations mandate held by the British, conditions intended to lead to the creation of a Jewish National Home in the area were created.

Jewish immigration to Palestine

Zionism formed in Europe as the national movement of the Jewish people. It sought to reestablish Jewish statehood in the ancient homeland. The first wave of Zionist immigration, dubbed the First Aliyah, lasted from 1882 to 1903. Some 30,000 Jews, mostly from the Russian Empire, reached Ottoman Palestine. They were driven both by the Zionist idea and by the wave of antisemitism in Europe, especially in the Russian Empire, which came in the form of brutal pogroms. They wanted to establish Jewish agricultural settlements and a Jewish majority in the land that would allow them to gain statehood. They mostly settled in the sparsely populated lowlands, which were swampy and subjected to Bedouin robbers.

The Arab inhabitants of Ottoman Palestine who saw the Zionist Jews settle next to them had no national affiliation. They saw themselves as subjects of the Ottoman Empire, members of the Islamic community and as Arabs, geographically, linguistically and culturally. Their strongest affiliation was their clan, family, village or tribe. There was no Arab or Palestinian Arab nationalist movement. In the first two decades of Zionist immigration, most of the opposition came from the wealthy landowners and noblemen who feared they would have to fight the Jews for the land in the future.

In the beginning of the 20th century, the Jewish population of Ottoman Palestine was between 60,000 and 85,000, two-thirds of them members of the Zionist movement, mostly living in 40 new settlements. They encountered very little violence in the form of feuds and conflict over land and resources with their Arab neighbours or criminal activity. Between 1909 and 1914, this changed, as Arabs killed 12 Jewish settlement guards and Arab nationalism and opposition to the Zionist enterprise increased. In 1911, Arabs attempted to thwart the establishment of a Jewish settlement in the Jezreel Valley, and the dispute resulted in the death of one Arab man and a Jewish guard. The Arabs called the Jews the "new Crusaders", and anti-Zionist rhetoric flourished. Tensions between Arabs and Jews led to violent disturbances on several occasions, notably in 1920, 1921, 1929 and 1936–1939.

World War I 

During the war, Palestine served as the frontline between the Ottoman Empire and the British Empire in Egypt. The war briefly halted Jewish-Arab friction. The British invaded the land in 1915 and 1916 after two unsuccessful Ottoman attacks on Sinai. They were assisted by the Arab tribes in Hejaz, led by the Hashemites, and promised them sovereignty over the Arab areas of the Ottoman Empire. Palestine was omitted from the promise, first planned to be a joint British-French domain, and after the Balfour Declaration in November 1917, a "national home for the Jewish people". The decision to support Zionism was driven by Zionist lobbying, led by Chaim Weizmann. Many of the British officials who supported the decisions supported Zionism for religious and humanitarian reasons. They also believed that a British-backed state would help defend the Suez Canal.

The Arab states 
Following World War II, the surrounding Arab states were emerging from mandatory rule. Transjordan, under the Hashemite ruler Abdullah I, gained independence from Britain in 1946 and was called Jordan in 1949, but remained under heavy British influence. Egypt gained nominal independence in 1922, but Britain continued to exert a strong influence on it until the Anglo-Egyptian Treaty of 1936 limited Britain's presence to a garrison of troops on the Suez Canal until 1945. Lebanon became an independent state in 1943, but French troops did not withdraw until 1946, the same year Syria won its independence from France.

In 1945, at British prompting, Egypt, Iraq, Lebanon, Saudi Arabia, Syria, Transjordan, and Yemen formed the Arab League to coordinate policy among the Arab states. Iraq and Transjordan coordinated closely, signing a mutual defence treaty, while Egypt, Syria, and Saudi Arabia feared that Transjordan would annex part or all of Palestine and use it as a stepping stone to attack or undermine Syria, Lebanon, and the Hijaz.

The 1947 UN Partition Plan

On 29 November 1947, the United Nations General Assembly adopted a resolution "recommending to the United Kingdom, as the mandatory Power for Palestine, and to all other Members of the United Nations the adoption and implementation, with regard to the future government of Palestine, of the Plan of Partition with Economic Union", UN General Assembly Resolution 181(II). This was an attempt to resolve the Arab-Jewish conflict by partitioning Palestine into "Independent Arab and Jewish States and the Special International Regime for the City of Jerusalem". Each state would comprise three major sections; the Arab state would also have an enclave at Jaffa in order to have a port on the Mediterranean.

With about 32% of the population, the Jews were allocated 56% of the territory. It contained 499,000 Jews and 438,000 Arabs and most of it was in the Negev desert. The Palestinian Arabs were allocated 42% of the land, which had a population of 818,000 Palestinian Arabs and 10,000 Jews. In consideration of its religious significance, the Jerusalem area, including Bethlehem, with 100,000 Jews and an equal number of Palestinian Arabs, was to become a Corpus Separatum, to be administered by the UN. The residents in the UN-administered territory were given the right to choose to be citizens of either of the new states.

The Jewish leadership accepted the partition plan as "the indispensable minimum," glad to gain international recognition but sorry that they did not receive more.
The representatives of the Palestinian Arabs and the Arab League firmly opposed the UN action and rejected its authority in the matter, arguing that the partition plan was unfair to the Arabs because of the population balance at that time. The Arabs rejected the partition, not because it was supposedly unfair, but because their leaders rejected any form of partition. They held "that the rule of Palestine should revert to its inhabitants, in accordance with the provisions of [...] the Charter of the United Nations." According to Article 73b of the Charter, the UN should develop self-government of the peoples in a territory under its administration.
In the immediate aftermath of the UN's approval of the partition plan, explosions of joy in the Jewish community were counterbalanced by discontent in the Arab community. Soon after, violence broke out and became more prevalent. Murders, reprisals, and counter-reprisals came fast upon each other, resulting in dozens killed on both sides. The sanguinary impasse persisted as no force intervened to put a stop to the escalating violence.

1947–1948 civil war in Mandatory Palestine

The first phase of the war took place from the United Nations General Assembly vote for the Partition Plan for Palestine on 29 November 1947 until the termination of the British Mandate and Israeli proclamation of statehood on 14 May 1948. During this period the Jewish and Arab communities of the British Mandate clashed, while the British organised their withdrawal and intervened only occasionally. In the first two months of the Civil War, around 1,000 people were killed and 2,000 injured, and by the end of March, the figure had risen to 2,000 dead and 4,000 wounded. These figures correspond to an average of more than 100 deaths and 200 casualties per week in a population of 2,000,000.

From January onwards, operations became increasingly militarised. A number of Arab Liberation Army regiments infiltrated Palestine, each active in a variety of distinct sectors around the coastal towns. They consolidated their presence in Galilee and Samaria. The Army of the Holy War, under Abd al-Qadir al-Husayni's command, came from Egypt with several hundred men. Having recruited a few thousand volunteers, al-Husayni organised the blockade of the 100,000 Jewish residents of Jerusalem.

To counter this, the Yishuv authorities tried to supply the city with convoys of up to 100 armoured vehicles, but the operation became more and more impractical as the number of casualties in the relief convoys surged. By March, al-Husayni's tactic had paid off. Almost all of Haganah's armoured vehicles had been destroyed, the blockade was in full operation, and hundreds of Haganah members who had tried to bring supplies into the city were killed. The situation for those in the Jewish settlements in the highly isolated Negev and North of Galilee was more critical.

This caused the US to withdraw its support for the Partition plan, and the Arab League began to believe that the Palestinian Arabs, reinforced by the Arab Liberation Army, could end the partition. The British decided on 7 February 1948 to support Transjordan's annexation of the Arab part of Palestine.

While the Jewish population was ordered to hold their ground everywhere at all costs, the Arab population was disrupted by general conditions of insecurity. Up to 100,000 Arabs from the urban upper and middle classes in Haifa, Jaffa and Jerusalem, or Jewish-dominated areas, evacuated abroad or to Arab centres to the east.

David Ben-Gurion ordered Yigal Yadin to plan for the announced intervention of the Arab states. The result of his analysis was Plan Dalet, which was put in place at the start of April.

Plan Dalet and second stage

The adoption of Plan Dalet marked the war's second phase, in which Haganah took the offensive.

The first operation, Nachshon, was directed at lifting the blockade on Jerusalem. In the last week of March, 136 supply trucks had tried to reach Jerusalem; only 41 had made it. The Arab attacks on communications and roads had intensified. The convoys' failure and the loss of Jewish armoured vehicles had shaken the Yishuv leaders' confidence.

1,500 men from Haganah's Givati brigade and Palmach's Harel brigade conducted sorties to free up the route to the city between 5 April and 20 April. The operation was successful, and two months' worth of foodstuffs were trucked into Jerusalem for distribution to the Jewish population. The operation's success was aided by al-Husayni's death in combat.

During this time, and independently of Haganah or Plan Dalet, irregular troops from Irgun and Lehi formations massacred 107 Arabs at Deir Yassin. The event was publicly deplored and criticised by the principal Jewish authorities and had a deep effect on the Arab population's morale. At the same time, the first  large-scale operation of the Arab Liberation Army ended in a debacle, as they were roundly defeated at Mishmar HaEmek. Their Druze allies left them through defection.

Within the framework of creating Jewish territorial continuity according to Plan Dalet, the forces of Haganah, Palmach and Irgun intended to conquer mixed zones of population. Tiberias, Haifa, Safed, Beisan, and Jaffa were taken before the end of the Mandate, with Acre falling shortly after. More than 250,000 Palestinian Arabs fled these locales.

The British had essentially withdrawn their troops. The situation pushed the neighbouring Arab states to intervene, but their preparation was not completed, and they could not assemble sufficient forces to turn the tide of the war. The majority of Palestinian Arab hopes lay with the Arab Legion of Transjordan's monarch, King Abdullah I. He did not intend to create a Palestinian Arab-run state, as he hoped to annex much of Mandatory Palestine. Playing both sides, he was in contact with the Jewish authorities and the Arab League.

Preparing for Arab intervention from neighbouring states, Haganah successfully launched Operations Yiftah and Ben-'Ami to secure the Jewish settlements of Galilee, and Operation Kilshon. This created an Israeli-controlled front around Jerusalem. The inconclusive meeting between Golda Meir and Abdullah I, followed by the Kfar Etzion massacre on 13 May by the Arab Legion, led to predictions that the battle for Jerusalem would be merciless.

Course of the 1948 Arab–Israeli War

Arab Invasion

On 14 May 1948, the day before the expiration of the British Mandate, David Ben-Gurion declared the establishment of a Jewish state in Eretz Israel, to be known as the State of Israel. Both superpower leaders, U.S. President Harry S. Truman and Soviet leader Joseph Stalin, immediately recognised the new state, while the Arab League refused to accept the UN partition plan, proclaimed the right of self-determination for the Arabs across the whole of Palestine, and maintained that the absence of legal authority made it necessary to intervene to protect Arab lives and property.

Over the next few days, contingents of four of the seven countries of the Arab League at that time, Egypt, Iraq, Transjordan, and Syria, invaded the former British Mandate of Palestine and fought the Israelis. They were supported by the Arab Liberation Army and corps of volunteers from Saudi Arabia, Lebanon and Yemen. The Arab armies launched a simultaneous offensive on all fronts: Egyptian forces invaded from the south, Jordanian and Iraqi forces from the east, and Syrian forces invaded from the north. Cooperation among the various Arab armies was poor.

First truce: 11 June – 8 July 1948

The UN declared a truce on 29 May, which began on 11 June and lasted 28 days. The ceasefire was overseen by UN mediator Folke Bernadotte and a team of UN Observers, army officers from Belgium, United States, Sweden and France. Bernadotte was voted in by the General Assembly to "assure the safety of the holy places, to safeguard the well being of the population, and to promote 'a peaceful adjustment of the future situation of Palestine'". He spoke of "peace by Christmas" but saw that the Arab world had continued to reject the existence of a Jewish state, whatever its borders.

An arms embargo was declared with the intention that neither side would make gains from the truce. Neither side respected the truce; both found ways around the restrictions. Both the Israelis and the Arabs used this time to improve their positions, a direct violation of the terms of the ceasefire.

"The Arabs violated the truce by reinforcing their lines with fresh units (including six companies of Sudanese regulars, a Saudi battalion  and contingents from Yemen and Morocco ) and by preventing supplies from reaching isolated Israeli settlements; occasionally, they opened fire along the lines". The Israeli Defense Forces violated the truce by acquiring weapons from Czechoslovakia, improving the training of its forces, and reorganising the army. Yitzhak Rabin, an IDF commander who would later become Israel's fifth prime minister, said, "[w]ithout the arms from Czechoslovakia... it is very doubtful whether we would have been able to conduct the war". As well as violating the arms and personnel embargo, both sides sent fresh units to the front. Israel's army increased its manpower from approximately 30,000 or 35,000 men to almost 65,000 during the truce and its arms supply to "more than twenty-five thousand rifles, five thousand machine guns, and more than fifty million bullets".

As the truce began, a British officer stationed in Haifa said the four-week-long truce "would certainly be exploited by the Jews to continue military training and reorganization while the Arabs would waste [them] feuding over the future divisions of the spoils". On 7 July, the day before the truce expired, Egyptian forces under General Muhammad Naguib renewed the war by attacking Negba.

Second phase: 8–18 July 1948
Israeli forces launched a simultaneous offensive on all three fronts: Dani, Dekel, and Kedem. The fighting was dominated by large-scale Israeli offensives and a defensive Arab posture and continued for ten days until the UN Security Council issued the Second Truce on 18 July.

Israeli Operation Danny resulted in the expulsion from Lydda and Ramle of 60,000 Palestinian residents. According to Benny Morris, in Ben-Gurion's view, Ramlah and Lydda constituted a special danger because their proximity might encourage cooperation between the Egyptian army, which had started its attack on Kibbutz Negbah, and the Arab Legion, which had taken the Lydda police station. Widespread looting took place during these operations, and about 100,000 Palestinians became refugees. In Operation Dekel, Nazareth was captured on 16 July. In Operation Brosh, Israel tried and failed to drive the Syrian army out of northeastern Galilee. By the time the second truce took effect at 19:00 18 July, Israel had taken the lower Galilee from Haifa Bay to the Sea of Galilee.

18 July 1948 – 10 March 1949
At 19:00 on 18 July, the second truce of the conflict went into effect after intense diplomatic efforts by the UN. On 16 September, a new partition for Palestine was proposed but it was rejected by both sides.

During the truce, the Egyptians regularly blocked the passage of supply convoys to the beleaguered northern Negev settlements by firing on them, contrary to the truce terms. On 15 October, they attacked another supply convoy, and the already planned Operation Yoav was launched. Its goal was to drive a wedge between the Egyptian forces along the coast and the Beersheba-Hebron-Jerusalem road, and to open the road to the encircled Negev settlements. Yoav was headed by Southern Front commander Yigal Allon. The operation was a success, shattering the Egyptian army ranks and forcing Egyptian forces to retreat from the northern Negev, Beersheba, and Ashdod. Meanwhile, on 19 October, Operation Ha-Har commenced operations in the Jerusalem Corridor.

On 22 October, the third truce went into effect.

Before dawn on 22 October, in defiance of the UN Security Council ceasefire order, ALA units stormed the IDF hilltop position of Sheikh Abd, overlooking Kibbutz Manara. The kibbutz was now besieged. Ben-Gurion initially rejected Moshe Carmel’s demand to launch a major counteroffensive. He was wary of antagonising the United Nations on the heels of its ceasefire order. During 24–25 October, ALA troops regularly sniped at Manara and traffic along the main road. In contacts with UN observers, Fawzi al-Qawuqji demanded that Israel evacuate neighbouring Kibbutz Yiftah and thin out its forces in Manara. The IDF demanded the ALA's withdrawal from the captured positions and, after a “no” from al-Qawuqji, informed the UN that it felt free to do as it pleased. On 24 October, the IDF launched Operation Hiram and captured the entire upper Galilee, originally attributed to the Arab state by the Partition Plan. It drove the ALA back to Lebanon. At the end of the month, Israel had captured the whole Galilee and had advanced  into Lebanon to the Litani River.

On 22 December, large IDF forces started Operation Horev. Its objective was to encircle the Egyptian Army in the Gaza Strip and force the Egyptians to end the war. The operation was a decisive Israeli victory, and Israeli raids into the Nitzana area and the Sinai Peninsula forced the Egyptian army into the Gaza Strip, where it was surrounded. Israeli forces withdrew from Sinai and Gaza under international pressure and after the British threatened to intervene against Israel. The Egyptian government announced on 6 January 1949 that it was willing to enter armistice negotiations. Allon persuaded Ben-Gurion to continue as planned, but Ben-Gurion told him: "Do you know the value of peace talks with Egypt? After all, that is our great dream!" He was sure that Transjordan and the other Arab states would follow suit. On 7 January 1949, a truce was achieved.

On 5 March, Israel launched Operation Uvda; by 10 March, the Israelis reached Umm Rashrash (where Eilat was built later) and took it without a battle. The Negev Brigade and Golani Brigade took part in the operation. They raised a hand-made flag ("The Ink Flag") and claimed Umm Rashrash for Israel.

Aftermath

Armistice lines

In 1949, Israel signed separate armistices with Egypt on 24 February, Lebanon on 23 March, Transjordan on 3 April, and Syria on 20 July. The armistice lines saw Israel holding about 78% of Mandatory Palestine (as it stood after the independence of Transjordan in 1946), 22% more than the UN Partition Plan had allocated. These ceasefire lines were known afterwards as the "Green Line". The Gaza Strip and the West Bank were occupied by Egypt and Transjordan, respectively. The United Nations Truce Supervision Organization and Mixed Armistice Commissions were set up to monitor ceasefires, supervise the armistice agreements, to prevent isolated incidents from escalating, and assist other UN peacekeeping operations in the region.

Casualties
Israel lost 6,373 of its people, about 1% of its population in the war. About 4,000 were soldiers and the rest were civilians. The exact number of Arab losses is unknown but is estimated at between 4,000 for Egypt (2,000), Jordan and Syria (1,000 each) and 15,000.

Demographic consequences
During the 1947–48 Civil War in Mandatory Palestine and the 1948 Arab–Israeli War that followed, around 700,000 Palestinian Arabs fled or were expelled. In 1951, the UN Conciliation Commission for Palestine estimated that the number of Palestinian refugees displaced from Israel was 711,000. This number did not include displaced Palestinians inside Israeli-held territory. The list of villages depopulated during the Arab–Israeli conflict includes more than 400 Arab villages. It also includes about ten Jewish villages and neighbourhoods.

The causes of the 1948 Palestinian exodus are a controversial topic among historians. The Palestinian refugee problem and the debate around the right of their return are also major issues of the Israeli–Palestinian conflict. Palestinians have staged annual demonstrations and protests on 15 May of each year.

During the 1948 Arab–Israeli War, around 10,000 Jews were forced to evacuate their homes in Palestine or Israel. The war indirectly created a second, major refugee problem, the Jewish exodus from Arab and Muslim lands. Partly because of the war between Jews and Arabs in Palestine, hundreds of thousands of Jews who lived in the Arab states were intimidated into flight, or were expelled from their native countries, most of them reaching Israel. The immediate reasons for the flight were the popular Arab hostility, including pogroms, triggered by the war in Palestine and anti-Jewish governmental measures. In the three years following the war, about 700,000 Jews immigrated to Israel, where they were absorbed, fed and housed mainly along the borders and in former Palestinian lands. Beginning in 1948, and continuing until 1972, an estimated 800,000 to 1,000,000 Jews fled or were expelled. From 1945 until the closure of 1952, more than 250,000 Jewish displaced persons lived in European refugee camps. About 136,000 of them immigrated to Israel. More than 270,000 Jews immigrated from Eastern Europe, mainly Romania and Poland (over 100,000 each). Overall 700,000 Jews settled in Israel, doubling its Jewish population.

Historiography
Since the war, different historiographical traditions have interpreted the events of 1948 differently; in the words of the New Historian Avi Shlaim, "each side subscribes to a different version of events." In the Israeli narrative, the war is Israel's War of Independence. In the Palestinian narrative, the War of 1948 is inextricable from the Nakba, and the Israelis are seen as conquerors and the Palestinians as victims. The different narratives of 1948 reflect these different perceptions.

The Israelis, whether or not they were conquerors, were irrefutably the victors of the war, and for this reason among others, "they were able to propagate more effectively than their opponents their version of this fateful war." Only in 1987 was that narrative effectively challenged outside the Arab world.

One of the issues is access to archival material

The historiography of 1948 is tied to political legitimacy in the present and has implications for the Israeli–Palestinian conflict. According to Avraham Sela and Neil Caplan:A major reason for this grip of the past over the present is the unfulfilled quest of both Israelis and Palestinians for legitimacy, in one or more of the following three senses: (a) each party's sense of its own legitimacy as a national community entitled to its own sovereign state; (b) each party's willingness to grant legitimacy to at least part of the competing national narrative of the other; and (c) the international community's extension of legitimacy to the competing rights and claims of Israelis and Palestinians.The narratives of 1948 have also had implications for Palestinian refugees.

Israeli narratives

Zionist narrative 
Avi Shlaim gives the conventional Zionist narrative or the "old history" of the 1948 war as follows:The conflict between Jews and Arabs in Palestine came to a head following the passage, on 29 November 1947, of the United Nations partition resolution that called for the establishment of two states, one Jewish and one Arab. The Jews accepted the U.N. plan despite the painful sacrifices it entailed, but the Palestinians, the neighboring Arab states, and the Arab League rejected it. Great Britain did everything in its power toward the end of the Palestine Mandate to frustrate the establishment of the Jewish state envisaged in the UN. plan. With the expiry of the Mandate and the proclamation of the State of Israel, seven Arab states sent their armies into Palestine with the firm intention of strangling the Jewish state at birth. The subsequent struggle was an unequal one between a Jewish David and an Arab Goliath. The infant Jewish state fought a desperate, heroic, and ultimately successful battle for survival against overwhelming odds. During the war, hundreds of thousands of Palestinians fled to the neighboring Arab states, mainly in response to orders from their leaders and despite Jewish pleas to stay and demonstrate that peaceful coexistence was possible. After the war, the story continues, Israeli leaders sought peace with all their heart and all their might but there was no one to talk to on the other side. Arab intransigence was alone responsible for the political deadlock, which was not broken until President Anwar Sadat's visit to Jerusalem thirty years later.According to Shlaim, this narrative is "not history in the proper sense of the word," as most of the literature on the war was produced—not by professional academic historians—but rather by participants in the war, politicians, soldiers, and state-sponsored historians, as well as by sympathetic journalists, chroniclers, and biographers. It also portrays Israelis as morally superior, lacks political analysis, and gives undue weight to "the heroic feats of the Israeli fighters." This nationalist narrative was taught in Israeli schools and used for gaining legitimacy internationally.

New Historians 

The standard Zionist narrative of the war remained unchallenged outside the Arab world until the war's fortieth anniversary, when a number of critical books came out, including Simha Flapan's The Birth of Israel: Myths and Realities (1987), Benny Morris's The Birth of the Palestinian Refugee Problem (1987), Ilan Pappé's Britain and the Arab-Israeli Conflict, 1948–51 (1988), and Shlaim's Collusion Across the Jordan: King Abdullah, the Zionist Movement and the Partition of Palestine (1988). According to Shlaim, the new historians disagreed with the Zionist narrative on six main points: British policy with regard to the Yishuv at the end of the Palestine Mandate, the military balance in 1948, the origins of the Palestinian refugee problem, the nature of relations between Israelis and Jordanians during the war, Arab aims in the war, and the reasons peace remained elusive after the war.

Among their most vitriolic critics was Shabtai Teveth, biographer of David Ben-Gurion, who published "The New Historians," a series of four weekly full-page articles attacking the new historians, in Haaretz May 1989. Teveth claimed that the new historiography was flawed in its practice and that it was politically motived, that it was pro-Palestinian and aimed to delegitimize the State of Israel.

Palestinian narratives 
Palestinian narratives of 1948 have not gone through the kinds of changes that Israeli narratives have. Instead, they have been more or less constant, focusing on Palestinians' indigenous rights to Palestine, Palestinian victimhood, dispossession, displacement, exile, statelessness, and more "unrequited grievances against colonialism and Zionism." Yoav Gelber identifies Arif al-Arif's six volume  written in Arabic in the 1950s as thorough and notable. 

Palestinian narratives have focused on countering the dominant Zionist narrative; the preëminent Palestinian historian of 1948 Walid Khalidi has dedicated much of his career to disproving the official Israeli narrative that the 1948 Palestinian exodus was voluntary.

Rashid Khalidi and other historians hold that "there is no established, authoritative Palestinian master narrative." They attribute this to, among other reasons, the dispersed and fragmented state of the Palestinian community and the loss, destruction, or appropriation by Israel of relevant documents and libraries. Without access to much in the way of archival materials, Palestinian historians have made use of oral history.

Arab narratives 
In the narratives of the wider Arab-Muslim world, 1948 is seen as an "Arab debacle," representative of the region’s social and political decline from its "glorious distant past." The official narratives of Arab states on 1948 tended to be apologetic with the goal of defending their political legitimacy, while the Arab nationalists wrote with a focus on distilling and extracting historical lessons to galvanize Arab society, politics, and ideology in preparation for the next conflict with Israel—neither approach bridled itself too much with historical accuracy.

Western narratives

In the United States 
The American journalist Joan Peters' 1984 book From Time Immemorial had a massive impact on how 1948 was understood in popular and political narratives in the United States.

In popular culture 
A 2015 PBS documentary, A Wing and a Prayer, depicts the Al Schwimmer-led airborne smuggling missions to arm Israel.

See also
 List of battles and operations in the 1948 Palestine war
 List of modern conflicts in the Middle East

Notes

Citations

Bibliography
 
 
 Yoav Gelber, Palestine 1948, Sussex Academic Press, Brighton, 2006, 
 Efraim Karsh, The Arab-Israeli Conflict: The Palestine War 1948, Osprey publishing, 2002.
 Walid Khalidi (ed.), All that remains..
 Walid Khalidi, Selected Documents on the 1948 Palestine War, Journal of Palestine Studies, 27(3), 79, 1998.
 
 Benny Morris, 1948, Yale University Press, 2008, 
 Ilan Pappe, The Ethnic Cleansing of Palestine, Oneworld Publications, 2006, 
 Eugene Rogan & Avi Shlaim, The War for Palestine — Rewriting the history of 1948, Cambridge University Press, 2001.
 David Tal, War in Palestine, 1948. Strategy and Diplomacy, Routledge, 2004.
Williamson, Bruce. "Caught in the Middle: Air Combat Between Israel and the RAF, 1948". Air Enthusiast 115, January–February 2005, pp. 2–10 

1948 Arab–Israeli War
1948 Palestine war
1948 Palestine war
1948 in Israel
1948 in Mandatory Palestine
1948 in the West Bank Governorate
1948 Palestine war
1948 Palestine war
1948 Palestinian exodus
1947 in Mandatory Palestine